Kallakuri Narayana Rao (28 April 1871 – 27 June 1927) was social reformer, play writer, Cinematographer and Indian nationalist. His honorific name is "Mahakavi". His famous plays were Varavikrayam, Chintamani, Madhuseva, Chitrabhyudayam and Padmavyuham(1919). His play chintamani  mainly depicted how Chintamani though born in a family of professional harlots, with her conscious devotion to Lord Krishna attained liberation. It also brought out the hazards of the practice of harlotry.

His play "Padmavyuham"(Army configuration of the Lotus)  used historical and mythological frameworks as allegories for contemporary conditions under British domination.

In his novel "Varavikrayam" about the Dowry system prevalent in British India. The film Varavikrayam is based on the novel and play of the same name by him.

His mythological verse plays are very popular.  He penned these myth-dramas based on the Ramayana, Mahabharata, Bhagavata, Siva Puranam and other epics.

References 

Telugu writers
1871 births
1927 deaths